Cardiff International Sports Campus, is an athletics stadium and playing fields in the Leckwith area of Cardiff, Wales.

The campus opened in 2009 as part of the major Leckwith Development, which included a new football and rugby stadium, Cardiff City Stadium, and a retail park.

In July 2015, Cardiff Council let the stadium and its grounds to Cardiff and Vale College, who further sublet the sports facilities to Cardiff City House of Sport. This lease runs for 30 years as a result of which the stadium is no longer open to the public during the day, although evening opening is unaffected.

Development
The original completion date of the main stadium building and floodlighting of the running track was moved back from May 2008 to early September 2008.

The stadium has replaced the older Cardiff Athletics Stadium, which has been demolished as part of the overall Leckwith development, which includes the Cardiff City Stadium.

The £5.7million project took 46 weeks to build.

Official opening 
The official opening of Cardiff International Sports Campus was on 19 January 2009, attended by former Welsh athletics star Colin Jackson.

Facilities
Stadium capacity is 4,953; 2,553 seated and 2,400 standing.

The stadium includes a gym, AstroTurf pitches, meeting rooms, and offices.

It includes the headquarters of Welsh Athletics—the sport's governing body for Wales—and Cardiff Amateur Athletic Club.

See also
 Sport in Cardiff

Notes

External links

Cardiff International Sports Stadium website

Landmarks in Cardiff
Cardiff2008
Sports venues in Cardiff
Stadiums in Cardiff
Sports venues completed in 2008